The 2006-07 Turkey Cup was the 45th edition of the annual tournament that determined the association football Süper Lig Turkish Cup champion under the auspices of the Turkish Football Federation (TFF). This tournament was conducted under the UEFA Cup system having replaced at the 44th edition a standard knockout competition scheme. The results of the tournament also determined which clubs would be promoted or relegated.

First qualifying round

|}
Source: Official page of 2006–07 Fortis Turkish Cup.

Second qualifying round

|}
Source: Official page of 2006–07 Fortis Turkish Cup.

Group stage
Group stage was played in 4 groups with five teams in each, in a one-leg league system.

Group A

Group B

Group C

Group D

Quarter-finals

|}
Source: Official page of 2006–07 Fortis Turkish Cup.

Semi-finals

|}
Source: Official page of 2006–07 Fortis Turkish Cup.

Final

Source: Official page of 2006–07 Fortis Turkish Cup.

References

2006-07
Cup
2006–07 domestic association football cups